The 1953–54 Southern Football League season was the 51st in the history of the league, an English football competition.

No new clubs had joined the league for this season so the league consisted of 22 clubs from previous season. Merthyr Tydfil were champions, winning their fifth Southern League title. Four Southern League clubs applied to join the Football League at the end of the season, but none were successful.

Final table

Football League elections
Four Southern League clubs applied for election to the Football League. However, none were successful as all four League clubs were re-elected.

References

Southern Football League seasons
S